Charles Lee Isbell Jr. is an American computationalist, researcher, and educator. He has been a professor in the Georgia Institute of Technology College of Computing since 2002, and since July 2019 is the John P. Imlay, Jr. Dean of the College. His research interests focus on machine learning and artificial intelligence, particularly interactive and human-centered AI. He has published over 100 scientific papers.  In addition to his research work, Isbell has been an advocate for increasing access to and diversity in higher education.

Early life and education
Isbell earned his bachelor of science degree in information and computer science in 1990 from the Georgia Institute of Technology, where he was named its outstanding student by the president as a part of Georgia's Annual Academic Recognition Day. Awarded a fellowship from AT&T Bell Labs as well as an NSF fellowship, he continued his education at the MIT Computer Science and Artificial Intelligence Laboratory. There, he pursued research in artificial intelligence and machine learning as well as introducing what may have been the first on-line Black History Database.  After earning his PhD from MIT in 1998, Isbell joined AT&T Labs – Research. In the fall of 2002, he returned to Georgia Tech to join the faculty of the College of Computing.

Career
At Georgia Tech, Isbell pursued reform in computing education. He received an award in 2006 for his work on Threads, Georgia Tech's structuring principle for computing curricula. He was also awarded in 2014 for being an architect of the Georgia Tech Online Master of Science in Computer Science, a MOOC-supported degree program that has received international attention and was the first of its kind. Isbell testified before Congress on the topic. In 2008, Isbell became an associate dean of the college. Four years later in 2012, he became the senior associate dean, and in 2017, he became the executive associate dean. 

As a professor and administrator, he has continued to focus on issues of broadening participation in computing. Isbell is the founding executive director for the Constellations Center for Equity in Computing.

In April 2019, it was announced that Isbell would succeed Zvi Galil as dean of the Georgia Tech College of Computing, a position he took up in July 2019.

Research
Isbell's research interests are in machine learning and artificial intelligence, and have focused on independent components analysis of problem spaces existing in hundreds of thousands of dimensions; developing extensions to description logics; developing new reinforcement-learning techniques for balancing multiple sources of reward in social environments; state and activity discovery; and partial programming. The unifying theme of his work in recent years has been using statistical machine learning to enable autonomous agents to engage in lifelong learning when in the presence of thousands of other intelligent agents, including humans. His work with agents who interact in social communities has been featured in the New York Times, the Washington Post, Time magazine, and congressional testimony.

Awards and honors
Isbell has won two "best paper" awards for technical contributions in artificial intelligence and machine learning; has been named a National Academy of Sciences Kavli Fellow; has been awarded both the NSF CAREER and DARPA CSSG awards for young investigators; and sits on or has sat on a number of advisory boards for NSF and DARPA.

Isbell was inducted as a fellow of the Association for Computing Machinery in 2018, with the citation: "For contributions to interactive machine learning; and for contributions to increasing access and diversity in computing". He was also inducted as a fellow of the Association for the Advancement of Artificial Intelligence in 2019, with the citation: "For significant contributions to the field of interactive machine learning, computing education, and for increasing access and diversity in computing." He was also elected as a member of the American Academy of Arts and Sciences in 2021.

References

1968 births
Living people
American computer scientists
Artificial intelligence researchers
Georgia Tech faculty
Fellows of the Association for Computing Machinery
Fellows of the Association for the Advancement of Artificial Intelligence
MIT School of Engineering alumni
African-American academics
African-American computer scientists
Georgia Tech alumni
Scientists at Bell Labs
21st-century African-American people
20th-century African-American people